Sri Lanka Schools XI cricket team was a Sri Lankan cricket team that represents Sri Lankan schools. The team featured in the first-class BCCSL Invitation Quadrangular Tournament in 2001/02 and 2002/03, and the Inter-Provincial Twenty20 tournament in 2007–08 and 2008–09, finishing in last place on both occasions.

Notable players

 Angelo Perera
 Bhanuka Rajapaksa
 Dhanushka Gunathilleke
 Dinesh Chandimal
 Vimukthi Perera

References

Former senior cricket clubs of Sri Lanka